Archibald Cochrane may refer to:

Archibald Cochrane (admiral), (1874–1952), Royal Navy officer
Archibald Cochrane (naval officer, born 1783), (1783–1829), Royal Navy officer
Archibald Cochrane (politician) (1885–1958), Scottish politician and naval officer
Archibald Cochrane, 9th Earl of Dundonald (1748–1831), Scottish nobleman and inventor
Archie Cochrane (1909–1988), British epidemiologist; namesake of the Cochrane Collaboration